The Tablet to The Hague is a letter which ʻAbdu'l-Bahá wrote to the Central Organisation for Durable Peace in The Hague, The Netherlands on 17 December 1919.

Historical background 
When the Central Organization for Durable Peace came together, it published its constitution in newspapers all over the world. This was read by Mr. Ahmad Yazdání who in consultation with Hand of the Cause Mr. Ibn-i-Asdaq wrote a paper to the organization informing them about the Baháʼí Principles and suggesting they seek guidance from ʻAbdu'l-Bahá regarding their aim to establish universal peace. The organization wrote a letter through Mr. Yazdání to ʻAbdu'l-Bahá dated February 11, 1916. When the letter arrived ʻAbdu'l-Bahá revealed the "Tablet to The Hague" which was delivered in person to the organization by Mr. Yazdání and Mr. Ibn-i-Asdaq in June 1920. The letter was dated February 11, 1916, but this letter did not arrive for many years due to the war. By the time the letter arrived the organization had already been disbanded in June 1919 after the signing of the treaty of Versailles.

Content of the Tablet 

In the tablet, ʻAbdu'l-Bahá gives an overview of Baháʼí principles, which include the following:
 Declaration of universal peace.
 Independent investigation of reality.
 Oneness of humanity.
 Religion must be the cause of fellowship and love.
 Religion must be in conformity with science and reason.
 Abandonment of religious, racial, political, economic and patriotic prejudices.
 One universal language.
 Equality of women and men.
 Voluntary sharing one's property.
 Man's freedom from the captivity of the world of nature.
 Religion is the ideal safeguard.
 Material civilization should be combined with Divine civilization.
 Promotion of education.
 Justice and right.

He declares that the League of Nations is "incapable of establishing universal peace", and calls for the establishment of a Supreme Tribunal, representing all countries:

Second Tablet to the Hague 
The organization wrote a response to the "Tablet to the Hague" on the 12th of June 1920. ʻAbdu'l-Bahá responded with a second, shorter tablet to the Hague on the July 12, 1920.

See also
 Baháʼí Faith in the Netherlands
 Hague Conventions of 1899 and 1907

Notes

References

External links
 The Journey of ʻAbdu'l-Bahá's Tablet to The Hague - A Photo Chronology

Works by `Abdu'l-Bahá
The Hague